Banarsi Prasad Saxena (aka Banarsi Prasad Saksena) was a historian associated with Allahabad University.

Saxena was awarded a PhD by University of London, School of Oriental Studies in 1931. He later became head of the departments of history in both the University of Allahabad and University of Jodhpur.

He was an expert on Emperor Shah Jahan, and his magnum opus Shah Jahan of Dilli (The subject of his PhD.) is regarded as the most authoritative text of that period and has run to several editions. Along with R.P. Tripathi he was noted as one of the major historians of the 'Allahabad School'. The idea of a "composite culture" in India, emphasizing mutual interactions between Hindu and Muslim communities in Indian history rather than treating the two communities as competitors with each other, was a particular contribution of this school.

Selected publications
. (Reprinted several times including 1962, 1968, and 1975.)
.
.
.

References

Year of birth missing
Year of death missing
20th-century Indian historians
Academic staff of the University of Allahabad
Historians of South Asia